Hana Mašková (26 September 1949 – 31 March 1972) was a Czech figure skater who competed for Czechoslovakia. She was the 1968 Olympic bronze medalist, a two-time World bronze medalist (1967, 1968), and the 1968 European champion.

Career 
As a child, Mašková spent her days on the ice at the Štvanice Stadium. Karel Glogar, who had been instrumental in the early career of two-time World champion Ája Vrzáňová, identified her talent. Her next coach was Jaroslav Sadílek, followed by Míla Nováková in 1963.

Mašková's international career started at the 1963 European Championships in Budapest. The next year, she competed in the 1964 World Championships in Dortmund. As a fifteen-year-old, she represented Czechoslovakia at the 1964 Winter Olympics in Innsbruck and placed 15th.

In 1967, Mašková won the silver medal at the European Championships in Ljubljana, Yugoslavia, finishing second to Gabriele Seyfert from East Germany (GDR). One year later, Mašková won the gold medal in Västerås in Sweden. She competed at the 1968 Winter Olympics in Grenoble, winning the bronze medal behind Peggy Fleming of the United States, who had already won two World titles, and Seyfert. She is the only Czech woman to win an Olympic medal in figure skating.

Ája Vrzáňová invited her to join a professional show, but Mašková decided to compete one more year. She took the silver medal at the 1969 European Championships in Garmisch-Partenkirchen, West Germany, behind Gabriele Seyfert. In 1969, Mašková left competition and joined the Holiday on Ice tour.

Death 

On 31 March 1972, Mašková was killed in a car crash near the French town Vouvray. Her tomb is at the Vyšehrad cemetery in Prague, decorated by a winged female torso made by Jan Štursa.

Competitive highlights

References

External links
 
 
 
 

1949 births
1972 deaths
Czech female single skaters
Figure skaters from Prague
Olympic figure skaters of Czechoslovakia
Figure skaters at the 1964 Winter Olympics
Figure skaters at the 1968 Winter Olympics
Olympic bronze medalists for Czechoslovakia
Road incident deaths in France
Czechoslovak female single skaters
Olympic medalists in figure skating
World Figure Skating Championships medalists
European Figure Skating Championships medalists
Medalists at the 1968 Winter Olympics
Burials at Vyšehrad Cemetery